The 2016 Sparta Prague Open was a professional tennis tournament played on clay courts. It was the third edition of the tournament which was part of the 2016 ATP Challenger Tour. It took place in Prague, Czech Republic between 6 and 11 June 2016.

Singles main-draw entrants

Seeds 

 1 Rankings as of 30 May 2016.

Other entrants 
The following players received wildcards into the singles main draw:
  Dominik Kellovský
  Patrik Rikl
  Robin Staněk
  Matěj Vocel

The following player received entry into the singles main draw with a protected ranking:
  Cedrik-Marcel Stebe

The following players received entry from the qualifying draw:
  Edoardo Eremin
  Lenny Hampel
  Zdeněk Kolář
  Dzmitry Zhyrmont

Champions

Singles 

  Adam Pavlásek def.  Stéphane Robert, 6–4, 3–6, 6–3

Doubles 

  Tomasz Bednarek /  Nikola Mektić def.  Zdeněk Kolář /  Matěj Vocel, 6–4, 5–7, [10–7]

External links 
 

2016 ATP Challenger Tour
2016
2016 in Czech tennis